The CMLL World Tag Team Championship (Campeonato Mundial de Parejas CMLL in Spanish) is a professional wrestling tag team championship promoted by the Mexican Lucha Libre wrestling-based promotion Consejo Mundial de Lucha Libre (CMLL; Spanish for "World Wrestling Council") since 1993. As it is a professional wrestling championship, it is not won legitimately; it is instead won via a scripted ending to a match or awarded to a wrestler because of a storyline. All title matches take place under two out of three falls rules.

In early 1993, then-CMLL booker Antonio Peña decided to leave the promotion and start his own professional wrestling promotion, Asistencia Asesoría y Administración (AAA); when Peña left CMLL, he acquired a number of wrestlers, among them the then-reigning Mexican National Tag Team Champions, Misterioso and Volador, leaving CMLL without a Tag Team title. In response, CMLL created the CMLL World Tag Team Championship to fill the void. On March 3, 1993, Canek and Dr. Wagner Jr. won a tournament to become the first CMLL World Tag Team Champions. Individually, Negro Casas has held the championship six times for a total of 2,577 days, the longest of any champion. The team of Último Guerrero and Dr. Wagner Jr. held the championship for seven days, the shortest reign of any champion. Negro Casas and Último Guerrero have the most title reigns with six each, while the combinations of Último Guerrero and Rey Bucanero and Averno and Mephisto are the only teams to have won the championship three times.

Title history

Combined reigns

By team

By individuals

Notes

References
General sources
[G] 
Specific

External links 
  CMLL World Tag Team Title History at Cagematch.net

Consejo Mundial de Lucha Libre championships
Professional wrestling tag team champion lists